The Inter-American Tropical Tuna Commission (abbreviated IATTC) (Sp.: Comisión Interamericana del Atún Tropical) is a tuna regional fishery management organisation responsible for the conservation and management of tuna and other marine resources in the eastern Pacific Ocean.

History

The Inter-American Tropical Tuna Commission was created by the Convention for the Establishment of an Inter-American Tropical Tuna Commission, signed between the United States and Costa Rica on May 31, 1949.  The Convention was signed by United States Secretary of State Dean Acheson and Costa Rica's Ambassador to the United States, Mario Echandi Jiménez. A number of additional countries later joined the Inter-American Tropical Tuna Commission.  Each country is represented by up to four Commissioners.

In 2003, the members of the Inter-American Tropical Tuna Commission signed the Antigua Convention, strengthening the Commission's powers.  Most members of the Commission ratified the Antigua Convention between 2004 and 2009, but as of 2011, the U.S. had not ratified the Antigua Convention.

The headquarters of the IATTC are located in La Jolla, San Diego, California, United States.

Members of the Inter-American Tropical Tuna Commission
An asterisk indicates that the state has ratified the Convention on the Establishment of the Inter-American Tropical Tuna Convention.

The IATTC also has significant responsibilities for the implementation of the International Dolphin Conservation Program (IDCP), and provides the Secretariat for that program.

The first objective of the Agreement on the International Dolphin Conservation Program (AIDCP) is to reduce incidental dolphin mortalities in the purse-seine fishery in the eastern Pacific Ocean to levels approaching zero. This Agreement and its predecessor, the 1992 La Jolla Agreement, have been spectacularly successful in meeting this objective, as shown by the reduction in mortality of dolphins incidental to fishing.

During 2013 95.4% of all sets made on tuna associated with dolphins were accomplished with no mortality or serious injury to the dolphins. Furthermore, the total mortality of dolphins in the fishery has been reduced from about 132,000 in 1986 to about 800 in 2013.

Cooperating Non-Members
Bolivia
Chile
Honduras
Indonesia
Liberia

Tropical tunas research

The IATTC, through the Achotines Laboratory is a major contributor of research in the early life history of tropical tunas. The Achotines Laboratory was established as part of the IATTC's Tuna-Billfish Program. It is one of the few research facilities in the world designed specifically for studies of the early life history of tropical tunas.  As tunas are pelagic (open-ocean) fish they are difficult to study in their natural habitat. Little is known from studies of live tunas of their reproductive activities or early life history (egg, larval, and early-juvenile stages), and for that reason the IATTC established a research laboratory to focus on these aspects of tuna biology.  The Achotines Laboratory provides a unique setting for studying the reproductive behavior and early life stages of tropical tunas.  While tunas are the main focus at the Laboratory, there are ample facilities to support research in other areas of marine and terrestrial science.

See also
Indian Ocean Tuna Commission

References

External links
IATTC homepage

Intergovernmental organizations established by treaty
Tuna
Organizations established in 1950
Organizations based in San Diego
Fisheries agencies